The Snow Queen is a South Korean television series starring Hyun Bin and Sung Yu-ri. It aired on KBS2 from November 13, 2006 to January 8, 2007 on Mondays and Tuesdays at 21:55 for 16 episodes.

Synopsis
The drama starts with Han Tae-woong (Hyun Bin), a quiet, 17 year old math genius, entering a prestigious high school. There he meets Kim Jung-kyu, also a genius in mathematics. The two immediately develop rivalry and tension, but later become best friends. Through their conversations, we learn that Jung-kyu is a big boxing enthusiast. Meanwhile, Tae-woong stumbles upon a little girl being bullied in the street and saves her. The girl develops a crush on him and gives him her pager so that she can see him again, but they never exchange names or contacts. They promise to meet again soon, but this never happens.

In a highly anticipated International Math Olympiad, Jung-kyu fails to fulfill his father's expectations to win the gold medal, and commits suicide in shame. Tae-woong, who wins the gold medal instead, struggles from guilt, as he feels like he is partly responsible for Jung-kyu's death. From guilt, Tae-woong quits school, leaves home, and disappears.

Eight years later, Tae-woong, now 25, is a nameless boxer, living a completely different life. He abandoned his mother, dropped out of school, left mathematics, and pursued boxing in honor of Jung-kyu, but he still bears painful memories of his past. He then meets Bo-ra (Sung Yu-ri), a beautiful, but cold-hearted young woman. She is the daughter of a rich businessman, but has an incurable disease. After a chain of events, Tae-woong is hired as her chauffeur. They end up falling in love, but Tae-woong discovers that she was the little girl that he met eight years earlier, and that she is Jung-kyu's little sister. Throughout the story the two learn to find true happiness by helping each other. Tae-woong melts Bo-ra's heart with love and helps her open up her heart. In return Bo-ra helps Tae-woong with his painful memories of the past.

Cast

Main characters
Hyun Bin as Han Tae-woong/Han Deuk-gu
Sung Yu-ri as Kim Bo-ra
Ko Joo-yeon as young Kim Bo-ra/Yeo-rin
Im Joo-hwan as Seo Geon-ho
Yoo In-young as Lee Seung-ri

Supporting characters
Go Doo-shim as Park Young-ok, Tae-woong's mother
Jang Jung-hee as Go Soon-ja, Bo-ra's housekeeper
Chun Ho-jin as Kim Jang-soo, Bo-ra's father
Oh Mi-hee as Bo-ra's mother
Kim Eung-soo as Lee Dong-sul, Seung-ri's father
Lee Cheol-min as Park Dong-pil, boxer
Kim Tae-hyun as Choi Choong-shik
Jung Hwa-young as Park Deuk-nam, Soon-ja's daughter
Lee Seon-ho as Kim Jung-kyu
Lee Seo-yoon as Hong Ji-hye
Kim Hak-jin as Ahn Sang-ho
Park Jin-young as Dr. Park, Bo-ra's doctor
Choi Deok-moon as Section chief Oh
Kim Jung-geun as Lee Geum-soo
Ryu Jae-seung as Jung Eun-bok
Kim Beol-rae as college math professor
Choi Yeo-jin (cameo)
Kim Yeo-jin (cameo)

Original Soundtrack

Part 1
 Intro - Kim Ji-su
 The Snow Queen (Main Theme) - Jo Sung-woo
 First Snow's Love - Kang Sung-min
 Poor Man - Choi Won-jun
 Grace Love - SAT & M
 Hello - Sogyumo Acacia Band
 If You Only Knew - Olivia
 The Snow Queen (Love Theme) - Jo Sung-woo
 Sub Title - Park Sung-il
 Jung-kyu's Death - Park Sung-il
 Waltz of Tears - Park Sung-il
 First Love - Kim Ji-su
 Ferma's Equation - Kim Ji-su
 Old Photo - Kim Ji-su
 First Snow's Love (Piano ver.) - Kwak Young-jun
 Outro - Park Sung-il

Part 2
 The Snow Queen - Main Theme (Inst.)
 Love... Irrepressible Tears - Jo Sung-mo
 I Feel Sad, but Goodbye - Kan Mi-youn
 Echo - Loveholic
 Sorry For Being Late - Ha Dong-kyun
 First Snow's Love - Kang Sung-min
 Loving U - ICE CREAM
 The Day We Broke Up - Nana
 What Can We Do? - A Hyun
 Love... Irrepressible Tears (Piano ver.)
 I Feel Sad, but Goodbye (Inst.)
 Love... Irrepressible Tars (Inst.)
 Echo (Inst.)
 What Can We Do? (Inst.)
 The Snow Queen - Main Theme (Guitar ver.)
 Old Photo (Inst.)
 Outro

Awards
 2006 KBS Drama Awards
 Popularity Award, Actor - Hyun Bin
 Popularity Award, Actress - Sung Yu-ri
 Netizen Award, Actor - Hyun Bin
 Best Couple Award - Hyun Bin and Sung Yu-ri

International broadcast
It aired in Japan on TV Tokyo beginning May 10, 2007. It was rebroadcast in March 2014 on Japanese cable channel LaLaTV.

It aired in Thailand on Channel 7 beginning November 3, 2007. It was rebroadcast in 2015 on True4U.

Remake
An Indonesian remake was titled Ratu.

References

External links 
 The Snow Queen official KBS website 
 The Snow Queen at Yoon's Color 
 
 

Korean-language television shows
2006 South Korean television series debuts
2007 South Korean television series endings
Korean Broadcasting System television dramas
South Korean romance television series
South Korean melodrama television series
Television shows based on fairy tales
Works based on The Snow Queen